"I'm a Marionette" is a song recorded by the Swedish pop group ABBA from their fifth album, ABBA: The Album. Written by Björn Ulvaeus and Benny Andersson, the song was originally part of a mini-musical called The Girl with the Golden Hair that ABBA performed on the 1977 concert tours of Europe and Australia. The other songs in the "mini-musical" were "Thank You for the Music", "I Wonder (Departure)" and "Get on the Carousel". With the exception of the last track, studio versions of these appeared on the 1977 ABBA album. "I'm a Marionette" was the B-side of "Take a Chance on Me", when it was released as a single. The live version of the song can be found on ABBA: the Movie

In 2013, Swedish heavy metal band Ghost released a cover of the song as the B-side of their single "Secular Haze", and later included it on the deluxe and Japanese editions of their album Infestissumam. It was also featured on their 2013 covers EP If You Have Ghost.

References

1977 songs
1978 singles
ABBA songs
Art rock songs
Polar Music singles
Progressive rock songs
Songs written by Benny Andersson and Björn Ulvaeus